Gökhan Süzen (born July 12, 1987 in Düzce) is a Turkish footballer who plays as a defender for Denizlispor.

Career

Club career
On 5 January 2013, Süzen signed to Beşiktaş J.K. with a €1.00 million transfer fee from Istanbul Büyükşehir Belediyespor
 On 1 September 2014, Beşiktaş loaned Süzen out Gaziantepspor for 2014-15 season.

International career
On 12 November 2011, Süzen invited to Turkey national football team by then-coach Guus Hiddink, for a friendly game against Netherlands but he has not been capped.

References

External links

 Guardian Stats Centre
 
 

1987 births
Living people
People from Düzce
Turkish footballers
İstanbul Başakşehir F.K. players
Beşiktaş J.K. footballers
Gaziantepspor footballers
Sivasspor footballers
Adanaspor footballers
Denizlispor footballers
Ümraniyespor footballers
Süper Lig players
TFF First League players
Turkey B international footballers
Association football defenders